Waratah  is a north-western residential suburb of Newcastle, New South Wales, Australia,  from Newcastle's central business district and bounded to the north by the Main North railway line. Waratah station was opened in 1858 and is served by NSW TrainLink's Hunter line.

History 
The first inhabitants of the land were the Awabakal people, who belong to the larger Awabagal/Gadjang subgroup, also called Worimi. Anthropologist Norman Tindale estimated that Awabakal territory covered about 1,800 km2.

Waratah was once a major municipality in its own right, incorporated in 1871, with an elected council and mayor. Two notable mayors, both elected to the office three times each were John Scholey and auctioneer N.B.Creer, both of whom resided at North Waratah (now Mayfield, New South Wales). Scholey was instrumental in the establishment of the Waratah Bowling Club, of which he was also patron.

Originally Waratah had a large colliery bearing its name as its industrial base.

The suburb contains a major acute hospital, the Calvary Mater (formerly the "Mater Misericordiae"), owned by the Roman Catholic Sisters of Mercy who, until recently, occupied all the most senior nursing positions. Nearby is a major 150+-bed independent retirement and nursing home, Maroba.

Rosary Convent 
In 1888, a nunnery was established by the Dominican Sisters in Waratah, which was used to teach deaf children. The foundation stone was laid on Rosary Sunday in 1888. From the 1950s, the number of nuns entering the convert was declining, and by 1989, there were only 180 nuns. The Dominican Sisters also set up the smaller Corpus Christi school. In 1987, the nuns relinquished the leadership of the school.

School for Deaf Girls 
In 1875, the Dominican Nuns of Cabra sent deaf nun Mary Gabriel Hogan from Ireland to Australia to teach deaf children. The school was located on Alfred Street and was in operation from 1886 to 1979. It was the only Catholic school in Australasia which catered for deaf children. On 8 December 1875, Catherine Sullivan, from Bathurst, was the first student to enrol. Between 1875 and 1888, 17 girls and 13 boys were enrolled from all parts of Australia and New Zealand. In the 1920s, more than 200 girls and 100 boys attended the school.

In 1922, the new St Gabriel's School for deaf boys in Castle Hill was created, and all boys were transferred from Waratah to that school. During the 1930s, the title of the school was changed from the Institution of the Deaf and Dumb to School for Deaf Girls. In 1938 Sister M Nobert O.P introduced a speech method in place of sign language. On 11 July 1948, a fire broke out in the girls' sleeping quarters and the school closed. It reopened in 1951. The school was mentioned in Commonwealth Government report titled "Why are they in children's homes: report of the ACOSS children's home intake survey in 1979", and was closed soon afterwards. After the closure, St Dominic's centre for hearing impaired children was opened in Mayfield.

Waratah House 
A grant was given to Charles Simpson due to his service to the Port of Newcastle. Simpson has cleared and established a farm. The house was completed by 1848. He named the house after the native shrubs growing in abundance in the area.· The house was said to have been known as "Simpson’s Folly" because of the distance it was located from Newcastle and Simpson's habit of commuting by boat. ·In 1848 Charles Simpson secured three allotments on "The Folly". Simpson decided to call his property Waratah House that a bunch of Waratah flowers grew on the property. This also how the suburb got the name Waratah.· The property was sold to Major Charles Bolton after Mr. Simpson's death in 1850. Major Bolton decided to subdivide the land and gave to Mr Thomas Tourtle in 1860. Tourtle was a wealthy squatter on the land who made a fortune on his station. He lived in the property until he died in 1899. The house was demolished in 1993 to allow BHP to establish a pipe mill.

Schools 
 Callaghan College Waratah Technology Campus (Years 7–10) (formerly Waratah High School, and before that Newcastle Boys' High School)
 Waratah Public School (State sector)
 St. Philip's Christian College
 Corpus Christi (Roman Catholic Primary School)

Local landmarks 

 Calvary Mater Hospital
 Maroba Nursing Home
Corpus Christi Catholic Church
 Waratah Oval and Park
Mens Shed 
Hunter Prostate Cancer Alliance
Waratah Police Station
Newcastle Eye Hospital 
Tinonee Gardens aged care facility
Braye Park 
Waratah has one shopping centre, Waratah Village, which contains a Coles and a 24-hour Kmart store, a newsagent/post office, Newcastle Permanent Building Society branch, Greater Building Society branch, and other specialty stores. It is renowned for an exuberant Christmas lighting display. 
Various shops and the old Waratahs Rugby Club have been converted into 2 childcare facilities.

Notes

References

External links 

Suburbs of Newcastle, New South Wales